Lee Constable is a science communicator, television presenter, children's author, and biologist who lives and works in Australia. She is best known for her work as a presenter on Scope between 2016–2020, Network Ten's science show aimed at children aged 7–13.

Early life and education
Constable grew up on a sheep farm in New South Wales. She undertook a double degree in science and arts, followed by honours in biology at Australian National University in Canberra. This was followed by a Master of Science Communication Outreach program at Australian National University.

Career
As part of her Master of Science Communication Outreach program, Constable toured remote areas of Australia performing science shows involving fire as part of the Questacon Science Circus. She started SoapBox, a youth-run radio show on sustainability and social justice.

Constable was the host of Scope, Network Ten's science show for children aged 7–13, from 2016 to 2020. Produced in association with CSIRO, the show aired on Network 10's channel 10 Peach. With Constable as presenter, the show became 'more intentionally accessible to kids who might not consider themselves stand-out students.'

In 2018, she was part of the largest all-female Antarctica expedition with Homeward Bound.

She also founded Co-Lab, an organisation that connects scientists and street artists to create live public science communication events, such as street art. She has spoken in industry events, including the Australian Science Communicators conference. She was selected by the Emerging Producer Program by the World Congress of Science and Factual Producers in 2018. She was awarded '2019 Alinta Energy – CEF Alumnus of the Year' by the Country Education Foundation of Australia.

In 2019, to tie in with World Environment Day, Penguin published Constable's book How to Save the Whole Stinkin' Planet, illustrated by James Hart, under its Puffin imprint.

As of 2022, she works as a social media producer for The Conversation.

References

External links
 IMDb profile for Lee Constable 

Living people
Australian television presenters
Australian children's writers
Science communicators
Year of birth missing (living people)